Overseal is a civil parish in the South Derbyshire district of Derbyshire, England.  The parish contains eight listed buildings that are recorded in the National Heritage List for England.   Of these, one is listed at Grade II*, the middle of the three grades, and the others are at Grade II, the lowest grade.  The parish contains the village of Overseal and the surrounding area.  All the listed buildings are in the village, and consist of houses and associated structures, farmhouses and farmbuildings, a school and a church.


Key

Buildings

References

Citations

Sources

 

Lists of listed buildings in Derbyshire